Trebula may refer to:
 Trebula Mutusca, an ancient Sabine town, modern Monteleone Sabino, Province of Rieti, Lazio
 Trebula Suffenas, an ancient Sabine town, location unknown
 Trebula Balliensis, modern Treglia, in the comune of Pontelatone, Province of Caserta, Campania